Brodec may refer to:
Czech Republic
 Brodec (Louny District)

North Macedonia
 Brodec, Gostivar
 Brodec, Tetovo